Chuck Wagon and the Wheels was an American country music group with a professional wrestling theme. It was composed of members:  Carl "Cal" Pyle (background vocals), and Sid Sequin (bass guitar, vocals), pseudonyms of brothers Gordon Kennedy, Bryan Kennedy, and Shelby Kennedy. The group signed to Lyric Street Records in 2000, releasing their album Off the Top Rope that year. It included the single "Beauty's in the Eye of the Beerholder," which peaked at 75 on the Billboard country singles charts. Bryan Kennedy purchased the rights to the name Chuck Wagon and the Wheels from the founding member of the original group, Chuck W. Maultsby, in 1998.

Discography

Studio albums

Singles

Music videos

References

American country music groups
Lyric Street Records artists
American musical trios
Musical groups established in 2000
Musical groups disestablished in 2000
Bands with fictional stage personas